Stanardsville Historic District is a national historic district located at Stanardsville, Greene County, Virginia. The district encompasses 146 contributing buildings, 4 contributing sites, 9 contributing structures, and 8 contributing objects in the Town of Stanardsville. It includes the Courthouse Square district and surrounding commercial and residential areas.  Notable buildings include the Stanardsville Methodist Church, Grace Episcopal Church (1901), Lafayette Hotel (c. 1840), Gibbons Store (c. 1845), John Sims house (1850), Greene County Chamber of Commerce (c. 1850), Forest Hill Academy (c. 1858), and Stanardsville Motor Company (1930).  Located in the district is the separately listed Greene County Courthouse.

It was listed on the National Register of Historic Places in 2004.

References

Historic districts on the National Register of Historic Places in Virginia
Buildings and structures in Greene County, Virginia
National Register of Historic Places in Greene County, Virginia